The Monroe Civic Center is a 7,600-seat, full-service, multi-purpose arena located in Monroe, Louisiana, built in 1965. The facility was home to the Monroe Moccasins ice hockey team and Louisiana Bayou Beast indoor football team.

Entertainment facilities
The Monroe Civic Center has multiple facilities:  

Civic Center Arena is the main complex of the Civic Center. The arena provides  of exhibit space along with 5,600 seats. The arena may have larger capacities up to 7,200 seats. The arena houses events such as banquets, circuses, music concerts, and rodeos. 
B. D. Robinson Conference Hall One of the three main buildings of the Civic Center is the 14,000 square foot Conference Hall. When using this facility, patrons have the option of dividing the Banquet Room into six sections. 
Monroe Convention Center is located on the Monroe Civic Center property, the Monroe Convention Center serves for meetings, banquets, luncheons, conventions, conferences, and trade shows. 
Jack Howard Theatre (2,200-capacity), named for W. L. "Jack" Howard, the Union Parish native who served as the mayor of Monroe from 1956 to 1972 and again from 1976 to 1978. The theater provides full-view seating for over 2,200. 
Equestrian Pavilion which features a separate warm-up arena and trailer parking equipped with electricity and other amenities.

Notable personalities
The Jackson 5 played two shows at this venue on April 5 & 6, 1971 on there Second National Tour. 
Elvis Presley played five sell-out shows at Monroe Civic Center, between March 1974 and May 1975. 
President Donald Trump also visited the facility to rally for Eddie Rispone for Louisiana governor in 2019.

See also
List of music venues

References

American Basketball Association (2000–present) venues
Basketball venues in Louisiana
Convention centers in Louisiana
Indoor arenas in Louisiana
Indoor ice hockey venues in Louisiana
Music venues in Louisiana
Sports venues in Monroe, Louisiana
Sports venues in Louisiana
Buildings and structures in Monroe, Louisiana
1967 establishments in Louisiana
Sports venues completed in 1967